Susa of Britonia was a medieval Britonian priest and bishop in Galicia.

External links 

  Official web site of the Diocese of Mondoñedo-Ferrol

7th-century Galician bishops